Kebraty is a rural locality (a settlement) and the administrative center of Kebratskoye Rural Settlement, Gaynsky District, Perm Krai, Russia. The population was 858 as of 2010. There are 15 streets.

Geography 
Kebraty is located 17 km northwest of Gayny (the district's administrative centre) by road. Shordyn is the nearest rural locality.

References 

Rural localities in Gaynsky District